is a Japanese manga artist. He has drawn several Dragon Ball-related manga and is best known for illustrating Dragon Ball Super (2015–present), which is written by series creator Akira Toriyama.

Early life and work
Toyotarou first came across Akira Toriyama's work in grade school with Dr. Slump, then the Dragon Ball anime, and finally the Dragon Ball manga. With his school notebooks covered in its characters, he was already making up story arcs for Dragon Ball chapters in his head. To this day he has never drawn any original work of his own, it has all been Dragon Ball-related. Previously a television director, Toyotarou never desired to be a career manga artist. "I figured it would be impossible to do it officially, so I resigned myself to doing it as a hobby." In 2012, he brought artwork to Shueisha, and six months later he debuted with the first two-page chapter of Dragon Ball Heroes: Victory Mission.

There is speculation that Toyotarou was the artist known as "Toyble", who created the unofficial Dragon Ball AF doujinshi in the 2000s.

Career
Toyotarou made his professional debut with Dragon Ball Heroes: Victory Mission in the November 2012 issue of the monthly magazine V Jump. It is a tie-in manga with the video game series Dragon Ball Heroes and ran for 28 chapters until it was put on hiatus after the February 2015 issue. A chapter 29 was included in the Bandai Official 5th Anniversary Fanbook: Dragon Ball Heroes 5th Anniversary Mission book published on November 19, 2015 and all previous chapters were uploaded to the game's website for free.

Toyotarou also drew a manga adaptation of the film Dragon Ball Z: Resurrection 'F', which was written by Toriyama. It began in the April 2015 issue of the monthly V Jump and ran for three chapters.

Toyotarou began Dragon Ball Super in the August 2015 issue of V Jump, which was released on June 20, 2015. He illustrates the manga while Toriyama writes the story. Although the anime usually adapted Toriyama's story ahead of the manga, some characters for the "Universe Survival arc" were reported as being designed by Toyotarou, and a few by both him and Toriyama. After covering the last story arc seen in the anime series in November 2018, the Dragon Ball Super manga continues with original story arcs.

He also worked with Toriyama on Dragon Ball Xenoverse 2 The Manga, an adaptation of the 2016 video game Dragon Ball Xenoverse 2 that he illustrated exclusively for the collector's edition of the game.

Style
Toyotarou is a self-taught artist, having never formally studied manga. When asked what his favorite manga is other than Dragon Ball, he answered with Toriyama's Soldier of Savings Cashman or Nobuhiro Watsuki's Rurouni Kenshin. He is more inspired by film than manga, particularly those made by Disney, Marvel, and Pixar.

Toyotarou explained that for Dragon Ball Super he receives the major plot points from Toriyama, before drawing the storyboard and filling in the details in between himself. He sends the storyboard to Toriyama for review, who gives feedback and makes alterations before returning it to Toyotarou, who illustrates the final manuscript and sends it to Shueisha for publication. During the last week of his monthly deadlines, Toyotarou estimated that he spends about 18 hours a day drawing.

Toriyama said that of everyone who works on the Dragon Ball franchise, Toyotarou's artwork is the closest to his own. Amy McNulty of Anime News Network concurred, calling Toyotarou's art "virtually indistinguishable" from Toriyama's. Toyotarou himself said he is confident in reproducing Toriyama's characters and their subtleties, but needs to practice on robots and mecha. As far as the differences, he noted that he draws more panels and close-ups than Toriyama and does his screentone digitally.

Works

Manga
 Dragon Ball Heroes: Victory Mission (2012–2015, serialized in V Jump)
 Dragon Ball Z: Resurrection 'F' (2015, written by Akira Toriyama, serialized in V Jump)
 Dragon Ball Super (2015–present, written by Akira Toriyama, serialized in V Jump)
 Dragon Ball Xenoverse 2 The Manga (2016, written by Akira Toriyama, included in the collector's edition of the video game)

Other work
 Super Dragon Ball Heroes: World Mission (2019) – designed the character

References

External links 

Dragon Ball Heroes: Victory Mission 

Manga artists
Japanese illustrators
Living people
Pseudonymous artists
1978 births